The 1957–58 Indiana Hoosiers men's basketball team represented Indiana University. Their head coach was Branch McCracken, who was in his 17th year. The team played its home games in The Fieldhouse in Bloomington, Indiana, and was a member of the Big Ten Conference.

The Hoosiers finished the regular season with an overall record of 13–11 and a conference record of 10–4, finishing 1st in the Big Ten Conference. As Big Ten Conference Champions, Indiana was invited to participate in the NCAA tournament, where the Hoosiers advanced to Regional Third Place.

Roster

Schedule/Results

|-
!colspan=8| Regular Season
|-

|-
!colspan=8| NCAA tournament

References

Indiana Hoosiers
Indiana Hoosiers men's basketball seasons
Indiana
1957 in sports in Indiana
1958 in sports in Indiana